The Laia were an indigenous Australian people of the state of Queensland.

Country
In Norman Tindale's estimation, the Laia had  of territory, ranging over the area to the north of the Palmer River, and east as far as the Great Dividing Range. Their western limits lay around the headwaters of the Alice River.

Alternative names
 Koko Laia.
 Kokowara. (Kuku Yalanji exonym, signifying 'bad speech')
 Coo-coo-warra.

Notes

Citations

Sources

Aboriginal peoples of Queensland